Dan McHale (born 1979) is an American college basketball coach. He served as the head men's basketball coach at Eastern Kentucky University from 2015 to 2018.

McHale, a native of Chatham, New Jersey, graduated from the University of Kentucky in 2001 and was a student basketball manager there. He was a staff assistant at Louisville from 2002 to 2004. McHale spent a season at Manhattan as the director of operations before returning to Louisville as the director of video operations. In 2007, he was hired as an assistant at Iona under Kevin Willard. McHale recruited Scott Machado to Iona and helped the team to 21 wins in his third season. He followed Willard to Seton Hall in 2010. He was hired at Minnesota in 2013 and spent two seasons as an assistant there, earning an NIT title in his first.

In April 2015, he was hired as head coach at Eastern Kentucky, replacing Jeff Neubauer. He used the full-court press and matchup zone defense he learned while an assistant for Rick Pitino.

On February 26, 2018 McHale was dismissed by EKU after three seasons.

On June 20, 2019 McHale was hired by the University of New Mexico as an assistant coach under Paul Weir.

Head coaching record

References

1979 births
Living people
American men's basketball coaches
College men's basketball head coaches in the United States
Eastern Kentucky Colonels men's basketball coaches
Seton Hall Pirates men's basketball coaches
Minnesota Golden Gophers men's basketball coaches
Iona Gaels men's basketball coaches
University of Kentucky alumni